See also Autoette (1910 automobile).

The Autoette was a microcar created and manufactured from 1948 to the 1970s by Royce Seevers, owner of the Autoette Electric Car Company Inc. of Long Beach, California. The two-seat, three-wheeled microcar was electric powered by specially made batteries from Trojan battery Co., and motive power provided by a converted 24-volt Dodge 1½ hp. electric starter motor and later a proprietary motor built for Autoette.  Models included the "CruiseAbout", "Golfmobile" and "Electric Truck".

Autoettes were available with a broad range of accessories, usually installed by the dealer as upgrades.  These included windscreens, doors, convertible tops, side curtains, and more.

The Autoette was also marketed and sold as an early electric wheelchair or invalid car for the disabled. Starting in 1953 some models could be equipped with a small "accessible" door on the vehicle's curb side, at the level of the seat, to facilitate entry.

External links
Flickr Group
The Autoette

Microcars
Electric vehicles introduced in the 20th century
Defunct motor vehicle manufacturers of the United States
Motor vehicle manufacturers based in California
Cars introduced in 1948